Thierry Chanthacheary Bin (born 1 June 1991) is a professional footballer who plays a defensive midfielder or centre back for Cambodian Premier League club PKR Svay Rieng. Bin has represented Cambodia national team at senior international level.

Club career

Phnom Penh Crown
After spending his early years in French football, Thierry returned to his parents' country and signed for Phnom Penh Crown FC where he would spend the next 4 years and winning 2 league titles.

Krabi
For 2017 season, Thierry Bin left Phnom Penh Crown and signed a three-year contract with Thai League 2 side Krabi.

Terengganu
On 5 December 2017, Thierry Bin signed a contract with newly promoted Malaysia Super League club Terengganu.

Sukhothai
On 4 December 2019, Thierry Bin announced he will be joining Thai League 1 side Sukhothai.

Perak
Thierry Bin is now a player for Perak FA playing in the Malaysian Super League

International career
Thierry Bin expressed his desire to play for Cambodia early on but he could not make his official debut due to FIFA's guidelines on citizenship. Hence he mostly played in unofficial friendlies instead. In 2013, he was selected for the Cambodian national football team to play at the 2013 Southeast Asian Games.

He played his first national team match on 17 March 2015 in a 2018 World Cup qualifying match against Macau. He also scored the first goal of the match in the 28th minute.

International goals
Scores and results list Cambodia's goal tally first.

Personal life
Thierry Bin was born in the Paris suburb of Villepinte to Cambodian parents. He is close friends with Boris Kok and Kouch Dani, two other French Cambodians playing for Phnom Penh Crown.

Honours

Phnom Penh Crown
Cambodian League: 2014, 2015
Perak FA
Unity Shield: 2020

References

1991 births
Living people
Cambodian footballers
Cambodia international footballers
French footballers
France youth international footballers
French people of Cambodian descent
Association football defenders
Association football utility players
FCM Aubervilliers players
Phnom Penh Crown FC players
Thierry Bin
Terengganu FC players
Cambodian expatriate footballers
Expatriate footballers in Thailand
People from Villepinte, Seine-Saint-Denis
Footballers from Seine-Saint-Denis
Visakha FC players
Cambodian Premier League players